Jan Viviani (born March 11, 1981) is an American fencer. He competed in the team épée event at the 2004 Summer Olympics.

References

External links
 

1981 births
Living people
American male épée fencers
Olympic fencers of the United States
Fencers at the 2004 Summer Olympics
Sportspeople from New York City